Nicholas Kendall (22 December 1800 – 8 June 1878) was born in St Mabyn, Cornwall.
Kendall was High Sheriff of Cornwall in 1847 and a Conservative Member of Parliament (MP). In 1858 he was chairman of the River Thames Select Committee during The Great Stink

The son of a vicar, Nicholas Kendall was a member of a Cornish landowning family. He was educated at Trinity College, Oxford. He was High Sheriff of Cornwall in 1847. In the same year he suppressed a riot at St Austell, on 11 June.   He was returned to parliament for East Cornwall, in conjunction with Thomas Agar-Robartes, in 1852, which position he retained without intermission until 1868. Mr Kendall was one of the county magistrates and also a deputy-lieutenant, and deputy warden of the Stannaries. For some time he was captain of the Royal Cornwall Rangers Militia.

References

External links 

 

1800 births
1878 deaths
Conservative Party (UK) MPs for English constituencies
Members of the Parliament of the United Kingdom for constituencies in Cornwall
UK MPs 1852–1857
UK MPs 1857–1859
UK MPs 1859–1865
UK MPs 1865–1868
High Sheriffs of Cornwall